Also known as Naysmyth's Submarine Mortar and the Steam Ram, the Anti-Invasion Floating Hammer was a semi-submerged naval ship design conceived and published by inventor James Nasmyth in 1853.

About
At the front of the boat was a hollow brass cap shaped like a ram that was 9 feet thick. Inside the ram was a case filled with a heavy charge of explosive powder. Because of potential dangers associated with its means of attack, the Anti-Invasion Floating Mortar was never built.

See also
Spar torpedo

Monitor (warship)

References

Semi-submersibles